Shevchenko National Preserve (ukr. Шевченківський національний заповідник; Shevchenkivskyi natsionlnyi zapovidnyk) is a national park near Kaniv (Ukraine), famous for the grave of Ukrainian poet Taras Shevchenko and a museum dedicated to his memory. The total area of the reserve is 45 hectares, the reserve includes eight cultural heritage sites, and borders the Kaniv Nature Reserve.

Background
On May 22, 1861, famous Ukrainian poet Taras Shevchenko was buried on a Chernecha hill, which afterwards was known as Tarasova. In 1884, the first folk museum of Taras Shevchenko was built on Tarasova Hill and a monumental cast-iron cross-monument designed ин Viktor Sichugov was erected. On June 10, 1918, the Council of Ministers of the Ukrainian State recognized the tomb of Taras Shevchenko as national property. In August 1925 Tarasova Hill was recognized as a reserve. 

During 1935–1937, the Taras Shevchenko Museum was built. In 1939, a new, bronze monument to the poet designed by Matvei Manizer was erected. Destroyed during the Second World War by the German army, the museum and the monument were rebuilt. In 1989, the preserve was granted national status and assumed its present name. This was confirmed by the Decree of the President of Ukraine in 1994.

Nowadays 
The reserve is included in the sphere of management of the Ministry of Culture and Tourism of Ukraine. The department is managed by the State Service for National Cultural Heritage.

The reserve is a cultural-educational, research and tourist center that studies and promotes the heritage of the Ukrainian national and world historical and cultural heritage, the work by Taras Shevchenko, the history of Chernecha hill, as well as protects cultural monuments from prehistoric times to the present, as well as the natural landscape. Its collection includes works by textile artist Hanna Veres.

Every year the museums of the Shevchenko National Preserve are visited by more than 100 thousand tourists from Ukraine and abroad.

General directors of Shevchenko National Preserve:
1989–2005 - Ihor Likhovy
2005–2010 - Maryan Pinyak
2010–2011 - Ihor Renkas
2011–2013 - Vasyl Kolomiets
2014–2015 - Vasyl Tulin
2015–2020 - Maryan Pinyak
Since 2020 - Valentyna Kovalenko

Gallery

Further reading 
  Kugno II  Kaniv. Guide to the city and its surroundings. Kyiv : Pandemia, 2006, pp. 22–24. ISBN 966-8947-00-2
 Shevchenko in 21 century // Ukraina moloda, 5.08.2010 р., c. 14.
 «Серед степу широкого на Вкраїні милій…»: to the 90th anniversary of the founding of the Shevchenko National Reserve in Kaniv (1925). Dates and events. Kyiv, 2014. pp. 36–40.

References

Links

 Taras Shevchenko National park, official page. 
 Shevchenko National Preserve Encyclopedia of Ukraine

Protected areas of Ukraine